The Russian Census of 2002 was the first census of the Russian Federation since the dissolution of the Soviet Union, carried out on October 9 through October 16, 2002. It was carried out by the Russian Federal Service of State Statistics (Rosstat).

Data collection
The census data were collected as of midnight October 9, 2002.

Resident population
The census was primarily intended to collect statistical information about the resident population
of Russian Federation. The resident population included:
 Russian citizens living in Russia (including those temporarily away from the country, provided the absence from the country was expected to last less than one year);
 non-citizens (i.e. foreign citizens and stateless persons) who were any of the following:
 legal permanent residents;
 persons who have arrived in the country with the intent to settle permanently or to seek asylum, regardless of whether they have actually obtained the appropriate immigration status;
 authorized foreign workers or students, provided the period of temporary residence in Russia was expected to last at least one year.

All detailed census tables are for the resident population.

All (resident) participants were asked questions on their gender, birth date, marital status, household composition, 
birthplace, citizenship, ethnic or tribal self-identification (национальность), education level, language
competence, sources of income, and employment status. A sample of the participants was also asked more
detailed questions about their economic and housing situation.

Non-residents
The census also counted two more groups of people:
 Russian citizens currently living abroad for more than one year in connection with employment with the federal government. 
 Persons (regardless of their citizenship) permanently residing abroad but temporarily present in Russia (as tourists, short-term foreign workers, or students, etc.).
Foreign citizens present in Russia as employees of foreign diplomatic missions or international organizations and members
of their household were excluded from the census altogether.

Census results
The Census recorded a resident population of 145,166,731 persons, including 67,605,133 men and 77,561,598 women.
That included an urban population of 106,429,000 (73%) and a rural population of 38,738,000 (27%).

The non-resident populations included:
 Russian citizens living abroad in connection with the federal government service: 107,288 (67,058 men and 40,230 women);
 Foreign residents present in Russia on the census date: 239,018 (177,465 men and 61,553 women).

Citizenship

Census participants were asked what country (or countries) they were citizens of. 142,442,000 respondents reported
being Russian citizens; among them, 44,000 also had citizenship of another country.

Among Russia's resident population, 1,025,413 foreign citizens and 429,881 stateless persons were counted. 

1,269,023 persons did not report their citizenship.

Language abilities
Among the questions asked was, "Are you competent in the Russian language?" (Владеете ли Вы русским языком?) and "What other languages are you competent in?" (Какими иными языками Вы владеете?). As the census manual explained, "competence" (владение) meant either the
ability to speak, read and write a language, or only the ability to speak it. 
The questions did not distinguish native and non-native speakers,
nor did they try to measure the degree of language competence. For small children, presumably, the recorded answer was based on the language(s) spoken by the parents.

142.6 million (98.3%) of the responders claimed competence in Russian. Other widely reported
languages (more than 500,000 speakers each) are listed in the table below.

1.42 million responders did not provide language information.

For a more detailed list, see List of languages of Russia.

See also
Demographics of Russia (includes ethnic composition and some other census results)
Russian Empire Census
Soviet Census

External links

Official census home page
 Population of Chechnya: was the Census correct?

Censuses in Russia
Census
2002 censuses